The Moghra Oasis is an uninhabited oasis in the northeastern part  of the Qattara Depression in the Western Desert of Egypt. It has a  lake containing brackish water, salt marshes and a swamp with reeds.

Geography
The floor of the Depression consists of salt marshes and dry lake beds that flood occasionally and there are also large areas of windblown sand. Adjoining it are salt marshes and some Phragmites swamps. To the south and west there are sand dunes near the lake and extensive sheets of sand beyond.

Geology
The water rises to the surface from an aquifer in the Nubian sandstone, but its precise source is unclear as the Nubian Sandstone Aquifer System is at great depths in this area. Just to the north of the oasis is a cliff which gives its name to the Moghra Formation, a thick layer of clastic sedimentary rocks with some minor carbonate interbeds. This formation contains fossils of vertebrates and plants; large mammals found here include hyaenodonts Megistotherium and Hyaenaelurus. These fluvial deposits are likely to have come from a river system which opened into the Nile Delta at the Moghra Oasis.

Ecology
To the south of the lake, the saltmarsh gradually merges into saline flats largely devoid of vegetation. There are three main species in this plant community, each dominating its own concentric zone; Zygophyllum album, Nitraria retusa and Tamarix nilotica. The most important variables affecting the distribution and structure of the communities are the moisture content of the soil and the salinity.

In the outer zone, where the salinity is low and the surface is friable, small scattered plants of Zygophyllum album occur. In the innermost part of this zone the plants are larger and more crowded and they sometimes form hummocks. Here they are associated with T. nilotica, Alhagi maurorum and N. retusa. The next zone is dominated by N. retusa which shows a wide range of tolerances to moisture and salinity conditions. Among sand dunes it forms hummocks and plays an important role in stabilising dunes. In the outer fringes of the zone it is associated with Z. album and T. nilotica while on the inner fringes, where the water table is high but the soil has a low salinity level, the community includes Phragmites australis, Juncus rigidus, Sporobolus spicatus and Z. album. The T. nilotica dominated area forms a scrub community on the outer fringes of the dune zone surrounding the salt flats, where it is associated with A. maurorum, Cressa cretica, N. retusa and Z album. There are a few abandoned groves of date palms in the sandy areas.

References

Oases of Egypt
Western Desert (Egypt)